Candarave may refer to several places:
Candarave, a city in southern Peru
Candarave District, a district in the Candarave Province
Candarave Province, a province in the Tacna Region of Peru